Karl Freller (born 2 March 1956, in Schwabach) is a German politician, representative of the Christian Social Union of Bavaria. He has been a member of the Landtag of Bavaria.

He is married and has three children.

See also
List of Bavarian Christian Social Union politicians

External links

References

Christian Social Union in Bavaria politicians
1956 births
Living people
People from Schwabach